Sir Graham Hills  (9 April 1926 – 9 February 2014) was a physical chemist,  principal of the University of Strathclyde, and a governor of the BBC. He was born in Southend-on-Sea, Essex and educated at Westcliff High School for Boys and Birkbeck College, London (BSc 1946, PhD 1950). He was knighted in 1988 for his services to education.

Academic career 

Hills served as a professor of Physical Chemistry at the University of Southampton for 18 years, until 1980, when he became principal at Strathclyde University, succeeding Samuel Curran who had held the post since 1959. There, his early foci were accommodating cuts to government funding by the University Grants Committee (UK), and dealing with the school's other financial difficulties. He found alternative sources of income, restructured the university (in 1982) to reduce its nine schools to four, and introduced early retirement for faculty members.  Hills also changed the academic year to the two-term semester structure.

With the financial challenges stabilized, Hills turned to expanding the university. Purchases were made in 1983 and 1986, respectively, of the Ramshorn Church and Barony Church - the latter restored in 1989 and converted into a graduation hall) - and in 1987 the acquisition of Marland House (a former British Telecom office block, which was renamed for Hills on his retirement). The "student village" on the eastern third of the campus was further expanded from the mid 1980s onwards.

After Sir Graham's retirement, he was the driving force behind the establishment of the University of the Highlands and Islands. He moved to Inverness to be a full-time advisor to the nascent university. In 2004 he coauthored, with Robin Lingard, the book UHI: The Making of a University, a comprehensive account of the university's creation.

Professional posts 
Imperial College, London: Lecturer in Physical Chemistry, 1949–1962
University of Southampton: Professor of Physical Chemistry, 1962–1980
University of Western Ontario: Visiting Professor, 1968
Case Western Reserve University: Visiting Professor, 1969
University of Buenos Aires, Visiting Professor, 1977
University of Strathclyde, Glasgow: Principal and Vice-Chancellor, 1980–1991

Professional committee work 
President of International Society of Electrochemistry, 1983–1985
Non-Executive Director: Scottish Post Office Bd, 1986–1999
Member: Council for Science and Technology, 1987–1993
Scottish Development Agency, 1988–1990
Member: Council for National Academic Awards, 1988–1993
Glasgow Action Partnership, 1989–1990
Scottish governor of the BBC, 1989–1994
Design Council, 1989–1990
Society of Chemical Industry, 1991–1993
Scottish Enterprise, 1991–1993
Design and Industries Association, 1992–1996
Chairman of the Council of Quarrier's Homes, 1992–1997
Chairman of the Ness Foundation (formerly Highland Psychiatric Res.), 1998–2003

Professional fellowships 
Fellow of the Royal Society of Edinburgh, 1990
Fellow of Scottish Vocational Education Council, 1989
Fellow of the Royal Society of Arts, 1978
Fellow of the Royal Society of Chemistry, 1950

Professional honours 
Hon. DSc: Southampton, 1984; Lisbon, 1994
Hon. ScD: Technical University of Lodz, Poland, 1984
Commander, Polish Order of Merit, 1984
Hon. LLD: Glasgow, 1985; Waterloo, Canada, 1991; Strathclyde, 1991
Royal Norwegian Order of Merit, 1986
Hon. Fellow of the Royal Scottish Academy of Music and Drama, 1988
Hon. Medal, University of Pavia, Italy, 1988
Hon. Fellow of the Polytechnic of East London, 1991
Hon. Fellow of the Royal College of Physicians and Surgeons of Glasgow, 1992
DUniv: Paisley, 1993
Hon. Fellow of the Chartered Society of Designers, 1996
Hon. DEd University of Abertay Dundee, 1999

Publications 
Hills, G. J. Reference Electrodes, 1961
Hills, G. J., Inheritance of Michael Faraday, (University of Southampton), 1964
Hills, G. J., Polarography, (Macmillan), 1964
Hills, G. J. (ed.) Electrochemistry: A Review of Chemical Literature: vols 1-3 (Specialist Periodical Reports), (Royal Society of Chemistry), 1970, 71, 73
Hills, G. J., Transactions of the Faraday Society Articles (Royal Society of Chemistry) (numerous contributions on electrochemistry
Hills, Graham & Lingard, Robin, UHI: The Making of a University, (Dunedin Academic Press), 2004

Honors
Honorary degree, University of Pavia, 1988

Obituaries 
A list of obituaries available online and accessed 3/8/2015:
 The Royal Society 
 The Scotsman. A photograph of Sir Graham is given here
 The Daily Telegraph. A photograph is also given here
 The Independent. This obituary was written by Tam Dalyell), with photograph
 The Herald. This is a letter written to the newspaper
 The Times Higher Educational Supplement
 The Royal Society of Chemistry
 The Strathclyde Telegraph. This is the university student newspaper

References

External links
 Papers of Sir Graham Hills available at Strathclyde University Archives. Collection OM/274

1926 births
2014 deaths
Academics of Imperial College London
Academics of the University of Southampton
Alumni of Birkbeck, University of London
BBC Governors
British physical chemists
Fellows of the Royal Society of Edinburgh
Knights Bachelor
People associated with the University of Strathclyde
People educated at Westcliff High School for Boys
People from Southend-on-Sea
Place of death missing